The 2017 Shimadzu All Japan Indoor Tennis Championships will be a professional tennis tournament played on carpet. It will be the 21st edition of the tournament which will be part of the 2017 ATP Challenger Tour. It will take place in Kyoto, Japan between 20 and 26 February.

Singles main draw entrants

Seeds

 1 Rankings are as of February 13, 2017.

Other entrants
The following players received wildcards into the singles main draw:
  Toru Horie
  Keito Uesugi
  Yosuke Watanuki
  Jumpei Yamasaki

The following player received entry into the singles main draw using a protected ranking:
  Cedrik-Marcel Stebe

The following players received entry from the qualifying draw:
  Lloyd Harris
  Evgeny Karlovskiy
  Kwon Soon-woo
  Jimmy Wang

The following player received entry as a lucky loser:
  Shuichi Sekiguchi

Champions

Singles

 Yasutaka Uchiyama def.  Blaž Kavčič 6–3, 6–4.

Doubles

 Sanchai Ratiwatana /  Sonchat Ratiwatana def.  Ruben Bemelmans /  Joris De Loore 4–6, 6–4, [10–7].

References

Shimadzu All Japan Indoor Tennis Championships
All Japan Indoor Tennis Championships
Shimadzu All Japan Indoor Tennis Championships